Ameiva ameiva, also known as the giant ameiva, green ameiva, South American ground lizard, or Amazon racerunner, is a species of lizard in the family Teiidae found in Central, South America, and some Caribbean Islands.

Geographic range
It is widespread in Central America and South America, including: Panama, Brazil, Colombia, Surinam, French Guiana, Guyana, Venezuela, Bolivia, Ecuador, Peru, Argentina, and Paraguay. It is also found on the Caribbean islands of Trinidad and Tobago, Grenada, the Grenadines, Barbados, Margarita, Swan Island, and Isla de la Providencia.  It was also once present on Saint Vincent but has since been extirpated.

Description
Ameiva ameiva has a streamlined body, pointed head, slightly forked tongue, and muscular hind legs. Both sexes have random black specks and mottling along the sides. Females usually have much less green than males and a more dusty of a green color. Males have vibrant green coloration and more bold mottling. Males also have more expanded jowls. They are popular as a pet because of the male's striking green coloration.

Habitat
They live on the forest floor, often sheltering underneath logs and in leaf litter. Captive individuals have been observed making tunnels spanning out from under a log or rock when given enough soil.

Diet
Its diet consists of mainly insects (such as grasshoppers, butterflies, cockroaches, beetles, termites, and insect larvae), frogs, other lizards (such as anoles), and spiders.

Reproduction
The female lays several clutches of eggs from March to December.

Invasive species
This species has been introduced into the United States with thriving populations in South Florida.

Parasites
This species is infected by a number of protist parasites including:
Acroeimeria pintoi
Choleoeimeria carinii
Plasmodium attenuatum
Plasmodium carmelinoi
Plasmodium cnemidophori
Plasmodium diminutivum
Plasmodium minasense
Plasmodium pifanoi
Plasmodium telfordi
Sarcocystis ameivamastigodryasi

References

Bibliography

External links

Ameiva ameiva at the Reptile Database

Ameiva
Reptiles of the Caribbean
Reptiles of Argentina
Reptiles of Bolivia
Reptiles of Brazil
Reptiles of Colombia
Reptiles of Ecuador
Reptiles of French Guiana
Reptiles of Guyana
Reptiles of Peru
Reptiles of Paraguay
Reptiles of Suriname
Reptiles of Venezuela
Reptiles described in 1758
Taxa named by Carl Linnaeus